Qatar established trade relations with the State of Israel in 1996, the first amongst all nations of the Arabian Peninsula after Oman reportedly did, concurrently with Israel–Jordan peace treaty. Until 2009, Qatar and Israel maintained diplomatic and financial relations, but due to Operation Cast Lead, Qatar broke ties with Israel. Since then there have been no diplomatic relations though there have been other links.

Diplomatic relations
Following the 2008–2009 Israel–Gaza conflict, Qatar hosted an emergency conference of Arab states and Iran to discuss the conflict. The Hamas administration in Gaza, as opposed to the Fatah-controlled Palestinian Authority in the West Bank, represented the Palestinians, undermining support for Palestinian President Mahmoud Abbas. Khalid Meshaal, the leader of Hamas, President Bashar al-Assad of Syria, and President Ahmadinejad of Iran urged all Arab states to cut any remaining ties to Israel.

In 2013, Qatar reportedly assisted in an Israeli operation to bring a group of Yemenite Jews to Israel. The claim was made by a Lebanese Arabic newspaper. According to the source, 60 Jews fleeing Yemen were allowed to transition from Doha on a flight to Israel.

On 30 April 2013, Qatari Prime Minister Sheikh Hamad bin Jassim al-Thani said that final status agreements with the Palestinians could involve land swaps instead of sticking to the 1967 borders. This was received positively in Israel with Justice Minister Tzipi Livni saying: "This news is very positive. In the tumultuous world around ... it could allow the Palestinians to enter the room and make the needed compromises and it sends a message to the Israeli public that this is not just about us and the Palestinians", adding that "peace between the Palestinians and the Israelis is ... a strategic choice for the Arab states".

Israeli leaders harshly criticized Qatar's diplomatic and financial support of Hamas in the wake of Operation Protective Edge, accusing the Qataris of being major sponsors of terrorism. Foreign Minister Avigdor Lieberman called for the banishment of Qatar-based Al Jazeera journalists from Israel.

On 9 March 2015, Qatar's ambassador to Gaza reportedly sought direct approval from Israel to import construction material into the Gaza Strip after Egypt had refused to allow the Qatari delegation through the Rafah border crossing. The Palestinian Authority and Fatah lashed out at Qatar, condemning their efforts to engage in direct communication with Israel. Jihad Harb, a political analyst and author, claimed that Qatar "might assume the role of mediator between Gaza and Israel, thus usurping the roles of the PA and Egypt."

In June 2015, the Qatari government facilitated discussions between Israel and Hamas in Doha to discuss a possible five-year ceasefire between the two parties.

In June 2017, Israel backed the Saudi-led bloc of Arab states opposed to Qatar in the 2017 Qatar diplomatic crisis, and announced the expulsion of Qatari state-funded broadcaster Al Jazeera Media Network from Israel. Emirati author Salem Al Ketbi claimed, without due substantiation, that towards the end of the 20th century, Qatar had boycotted some countries that resorted to peace and normalisation of relations with Israel.

Diplomatic visits
Despite Qatar's support of Hamas, Israeli leaders have maintained direct contact with the emirate. In January 2007, in his last months as vice premier, former President Shimon Peres paid a high-profile visit to the capital city of Doha. Peres also visited Qatar in 1996, when he launched the new Israeli trade bureau there.

In January 2008, Israeli Defense Minister Ehud Barak met with former Qatari Prime Minister Sheikh Abdullah bin Khalifa al-Thani in Switzerland, at the World Economic Forum. The existence of the surreptitious talks has so far been kept secretive by Israel.

Foreign Affairs Minister Tzipi Livni also met with the Qatari Emir at a UN conference in 2008. In April 2008, she visited Qatar where she attended a conference and met the Emir, the Prime Minister and the Minister of Oil and Gas.

Cultural relations

The Qatar National Olympic Committee and the State of Israel co-funded the Doha Stadium in the Israeli Arab city of Sakhnin located in the Galilee region of Israel. The stadium was named after the Qatari city of Doha. The decision by the Qataris to build the stadium in Israel came after a meeting between the Arab Knesset member Ahmad Tibi and Secretary-General of the Qatar National Olympic Committee Sheikh Saud Abdulrahman Al Thani after Tibi expressed his concern on the conditions for sport in Sakhnin among the Arab society inside Israel. The involvement of Qatar was to show that relations between the two nations are peaceful and with a similar interest.

In February 2020, Israeli doctor Vered Windman attended the ISPCAN event in Doha, Qatar.

When Qatar was awarded the right to host the 2022 FIFA World Cup, they stated that Israel would be allowed to compete in the tournament should they qualify.

Economic relations
Qatar established trade relations with Israel in 1996, the first state bordering the Persian Gulf to do so. In 2000, Israel's trade office in Qatar was closed down by authorities.

Qatar permanently severed trade relations with Israel in 2009 following Operation Cast Lead. In 2010, Qatar twice offered to restore trade relations with Israel and allow the reinstatement of the Israeli mission in Doha, on the condition that Israel allow Qatar to send building materials and money to Gaza to help rehabilitate infrastructure, and that Israel make a public statement expressing appreciation for Qatar's role and acknowledging its standing in the Middle East. Israel refused on the grounds that Qatari supplies could be used by Hamas to build bunkers and reinforced positions from which to fire rockets at Israeli cities and towns, and that Israel did not want to get involved in the competition between Qatar and Egypt over the Middle East mediation.

According to the Israeli Central Bureau of Statistics, Israeli exports to Qatar amounted to $509,000 in 2012, mainly machinery, computer equipment and medical instruments. Imports from Qatar amounted to $353,000 in 2013, mainly plastics.

In December 2018, Israel permitted a €13 million payment from Qatar to Gazan workers as part of a six monthly payment to help with humanitarian crisis in the Gaza region. There have been frequent talks between Israel and Qatar on matters relating to Gaza since 2014 via Qatar's envoy to Gaza Mohammed al-Emadi who has been in regular contact with Israel.

In November 2021 Israel and Qatar signed an agreement allowing Qatar to trade in diamonds and Israeli merchants to enter Qatar and open offices.

Sporting events
In February 2008, tennis player Shahar Pe'er became the first Israeli to compete in a WTA Tour event in the Arabian Peninsula when she reached the third round of the Qatar Total Open in Doha. Later on, she competed again in Qatar in 2012.

In 2009, Qatar said that it would welcome Israel footballers if it were to win the bid for the 2022 FIFA World Cup.

In 2014, Israeli swimmers took part in the 2014 FINA World Swimming Championships (25 m) in Doha. In 2016, Israeli beach volleyball duo, Sean Faiga and Ariel Hilman, participated in the FIVB Qatar Open in Doha.

In January 2018, Israeli tennis player Dudi Sela competed at the 2018 Qatar ExxonMobil Open. In February, Israeli youth handball team played at the 2018 Handball World School Championship in Qatar. In October, Israeli gymnasts competed in the 2018 World Artistic Gymnastics Championships, which was held for the first time in Doha, Qatar and the Middle East. In November, Israeli equestrian Danielle Goldstein participated in the 2018 Global Champions Tour in Doha, Qatar.

In March 2019, the Israeli national anthem was played in Qatar after Israeli gymnast Alexander Shatilov won the gold medal for the floor exercise during the 2019 FIG Artistic Gymnastics World Cup series. In Autumn 2019, Israeli athletes contended at the 2019 World Athletics Championships in Doha, Qatar.

In January 2021, Israelis competed at the 2021 Judo World Masters in Doha. In June 2021, Israeli Artem Dolgopyat won a gold medal at the 2021 FIG Artistic Gymnastics World Cup series, hosted in Doha.

In 2022, Israel and Qatar announced they would be starting direct flights between Tel Aviv and Doha for the FIFA World Cup. However the two countries have not renewed official relations.

See also
History of the Jews in Qatar

References

External links
 Yaari, Michal Israel and Qatar: relations nurtured by the Palestinian issue. Ramat Gan, Mitvim, March 2020. At mitvim.org.il/en/

 
Qatar
Bilateral relations of Qatar